Saiko may refer to:

 Saikō, a Japanese era
 Saiko (band), a Chilean rock band
 Saiko Lake, in Yamanashi Prefecture, Japan

People
 Ema Saikō (1787–1861), Japanese painter, poet and calligrapher
 Jean-Philippe Saïko (born 1990), New Caledonian footballer
 Shaun Saiko (born 1989), Canadian footballer
 , Japanese women's footballer
 , Japanese painter

See also
 Psycho (disambiguation)
 Saikot, a village in Uttarakhand, India
 Seiko (disambiguation)

Japanese feminine given names